Karjalohja is a former municipality of Finland.

It is located in the province of Southern Finland and is part of the Uusimaa region.

Karjalohja was consolidated with the town of Lohja on 1 January 2013.

The municipality was unilingually Finnish.

Villages
Prior to its consolidation into Lohja in 2013, Karjalohja contained of the following villages:

 Härjänvatsa, Ilmoniemi, Immola, Karkali, Kattelus, Kourjoki, Kuusia, Kärkelä, Lohjantaipale, Lönnhammar (Linhamari), Maila, Makkarjoki, Murto, Mustlahti, Nummijärvi, Pappila, Pellonkylä, Pipola, Pitkälahti (Långvik), Puujärvi, Pyöli, Saarenpää, Sakkola, Suurniemi, Särkjärvi, Tallaa and Tammisto

Politics
Results of the 2011 Finnish parliamentary election in Karjalohja:

True Finns 21.9%
Social Democratic Party 20.3%
National Coalition Party 19.9%
Centre Party 16.5%
Green League 11.3%
Left Alliance 4.2%
Swedish People's Party 1.8%
Christian Democrats 1.5%

People born in Karjalohja
Artturi Aalto (1876–1937)

References

External links

Municipality of Karjalohja – Official website 

Lohja
Populated places established in 1614
Former municipalities of Finland
Populated places disestablished in 2013
1614 establishments in Sweden